The 2012 Uttarakhand Legislative Assembly election were the 3rd Vidhan Sabha (Legislative Assembly) election of the state of Uttarakhand in India. Elections were held on 30 January 2012 when Indian National Congress emerged as the largest party with 32 seats in the 70-seat legislature and formed the government with the help of Progressive Democratic Front alliance (Bahujan Samaj Party, Uttarakhand Kranti Dal (P) and Independents). The Bharatiya Janata Party with 31 seats served as the official opposition.

Results

The Indian National Congress emerged as the largest party with 32 seats in a house of 70. They were still four short of the majority to form a government. After much wrangling it was announced that the Bahujan Samaj Party, Uttarakhand Kranti Dal (P) and the three Independents would be supporting the government. The incumbent Bharatiya Janata Party Government lost as they had only 31 seats out of 70 seats, lagging just one seat behind Indian National Congress.

After protracted discussions it was announced the Vijay Bahuguna would be Chief Minister and Harish Rawat would continue to serve as the Union Minister for Water Resources in the UPA government at Union level.

List of elected Assembly members

See also
3rd Uttarakhand Assembly
Bahuguna ministry
Harish Rawat ministry
Elections in Uttarakhand
Politics of Uttarakhand
2012 elections in India

References
http://ceo.uk.gov.in/files/Election2012/RESULTS_2012_Uttarakhand_State.pdf

2012 State Assembly elections in India
2012
January 2012 events in India